Skanda Ashok (born 26 April 1986) is an Indian actor who has appeared in Kannada, Malayalam, Tamil and Telugu films. He made his breakthrough playing Sooraj Menon in the coming-of-age Malayalam film, Notebook (2006), before gaining critical acclaim for his performances in the thriller films Elektra (2010) and the bilingual horror Chaarulatha (2012).

Film career
Skanda made his acting debut in the coming-of-age Malayalam film, Notebook (2006), after being spotted by director Rosshan Andrews in commercials. The film featured him alongside actresses Parvathy, Roma and Mariya Roy, with Skanda appearing as the boyfriend of Mariya's character. Notebook performed well at the box office, and the success of the film saw Skanda alternatively credited as Sooraj, his character's name, for his following Malayalam films. He then moved on to feature in a secondary lead role in the Malayalam film Positive (2008), before playing the lead role in Malli Malli (2009), a Telugu romantic film co-starring Kalyani. However both films did not perform well at the box office, while another Tamil film titled Sandrom was shelved after it shoot. Skanda then made a comeback by featuring in the critically acclaimed horror film Elektra (2010), featuring alongside Prakash Raj, Manisha Koirala and Nayanthara. He has since worked on films including the bilingual horror film Chaarulatha (2012), the Kannada thriller film U Turn (2016) and as the second lead actor in Mupparimanam (2017).

In 2017, he moved onto work in television serials, first appearing in Radha Ramana.

Filmography

Television

Awards
Asianet Film Awards
 2006  - Asianet Award for Best Male New Face of the Year - Notebook

Colors TV Anubandha Awards
 2017  -  Jana Mecchinda Jodi with Shwetha R Prasad - Radha Ramana
 2017  -  Mane Mecchinda Maga(Best Son on screen) - Radha Ramana
 2019  - Jana Mecchinda Nayaka Award - Radha Ramana

References

External links
 

Living people
Kannada male actors
Male actors from Karnataka
21st-century Indian male actors
Male actors in Tamil cinema
People from Chikkamagaluru
Male actors in Malayalam cinema
Indian male film actors
Male actors in Kannada cinema
1986 births